Eugene C. Keyes (August 23, 1900 – 1963) was the 45th and 47th lieutenant governor of Michigan from 1943 to 1945 and 1947 to 1949.

Early life and education

Born in Dearborn, Michigan, Keyes studied as a doctor and lawyer, receiving several degrees. In 1921, the Royal College of Dental Surgeons awarded him a Doctor of Dental Surgery, followed by a Doctor of Medicine degree from Wayne State University in 1930. In 1932, he founded the Keyes Diagnostic Clinic in Dearborn. In 1935, Keyes earned a law degree from the Detroit College of Law.

Political career

Before serving as lieutenant governor, Keyes was a county supervisor and city councilman in his home city. He was affiliated with the Republican Party. Keyes served as lieutenant governor under two governors, Harry Kelly from 1943 to 1945 and Kim Sigler from 1947 to 1949, both of whom were also Republicans.

In 1965, two years after Keyes death, the clinic he founded was demolished to make way for parking lots.

References

1900 births
1963 deaths
Politicians from Dearborn, Michigan
Detroit College of Law alumni
Michigan city council members
County commissioners in Michigan
Wayne State University people
Lieutenant Governors of Michigan
Michigan Republicans
20th-century American politicians